Lee Young-ja is a Korean name consisting of the family name Lee and the given name Young-ja, and may refer to:

 Young-ja Lee (born 1931), South Korean composer
 Lee Young-ja (handballer) (born 1964), South Korean handballer
 Lee Young-ja (comedian) (born 1968), South Korean comedian